Benjamin Borenstein (November 5, 1928 - September 7, 2006) was an American food scientist who was involved in vitamin fortification.

Employed with Hoffman-La Roche until his 1987 retirement, Borenstein played a key role in fortifying vitamins. He also served as an adjunct professor, and late honorary professor, at Rutgers University in New Brunswick, New Jersey.

An active member of the Institute of Food Technologists (IFT), Borenstein was named a fellow in 1979. He won the Babcock-Hart Award 1996.

Borenstein retired to Delray Beach, Florida with his wife Blanche.  He died on September 7, 2006 of Parkinson's Disease.

References
"In Memoriam: Benjamin Borenstein." Food Technology. December 2006. p. 97.
List of IFT past award winners
List of IFT Fellows

American food scientists
Fellows of the Institute of Food Technologists
Rutgers University faculty
People from New Jersey
1928 births
2006 deaths
People from Delray Beach, Florida